John Barker (died 1636) was an English politician who sat in the House of Commons twice between 1624 and 1628.

Barker was a merchant of Bristol and an alderman. He was Sheriff in 1612. In 1624, he was elected Member of Parliament for Bristol. He was Mayor of Bristol in 1625. In 1628 he was elected MP for Bristol again and sat until 1629 when King Charles decided to rule without parliament for eleven years.  
 
Barker died in 1636 and had a monument at St Werburgh's Church.

References

 

Year of birth missing
1636 deaths
Mayors of Bristol
English merchants
High Sheriffs of Bristol
English MPs 1624–1625
English MPs 1628–1629